Woodmount is a townland in the civil parish of Creagh in South County Roscommon, Ireland, situated approximately 3.5 miles due east of the town of Ballinasloe (County Galway), and approximately 800 metres north off the Old N6 Athlone to Ballinasloe road. In the Gaelic language it is called Tonalig, which translate as the "End or Bottom of the Wood". The clubhouse and playing fields of Padraig Pearses GAA Roscommon club have been situated in Woodmount since 1983.

Townlands of County Roscommon